Good Ol' Fashioned Love is the debut studio album by British-Irish doo-wop boy band The Overtones. The album was released on 1 November 2010 in the UK by Rhino Entertainment. The album was subsequently re-released on 8 March 2011, containing a number of new tracks. The album peaked at number 4 on the UK Albums Chart and number 14 on the Irish Albums Chart. The album was released in Germany and Austria on 23 March 2012, renamed Gambling Man.

The album has sold 470,000 copies as of April 2018.

Singles
 "Gambling Man" was released as the first single from the album on 8 October 2010. The track peaked at number 82 on the UK Singles Chart, and was later released as the album's lead single in international territories such as Germany and Austria.
 "The Longest Time", a cover of the Billy Joel original, was released as the second single from the album on 25 April 2011. It was the only cover version from the album to be released as a single.
 "Second Last Chance" was released as the third single from the album on 15 August 2011. It was the first single to be released from the Platinum edition of the album.
 "Say What I Feel" was released as the fourth and final single from the album on 16 December 2011. It was the second original song to be released from the album as a single. The track was co-written by 5ive member Sean Conlon and songwriter Peter-John Vetesse.

Track listing

Charts

Weekly charts

Good Ol' Fashioned Love

Gambling Man

Year-end charts

Good Ol' Fashioned Love

Release history

References

2010 debut albums
The Overtones albums